Judson Whitlocke Lyons was an American politician and attorney. He became the first African American attorney in Georgia in 1884 and later served as the Register of the Treasury.

Early life and education
Lyons was born into slavery in Burke County, Georgia in 1860 and moved with his family to Augusta, Georgia in 1871. He attended the Augusta Institute, which later became Morehouse College. Lyons graduated from the Howard University School of Law in 1884.

Career
Lyons was active in Republican Party politics from an early age. In 1880, Lyons was the youngest member of the Republican National Convention at the age of 20. He briefly worked in the U.S. Treasury Department before enrolling in law school. After graduating Lyons was admitted to the Georgia Bar, becoming the first African American licensed to practice law in the state.

He formed a law firm in 1896 with Henry Moses Porter. Lyons was elected to represent Georgia on the Republican National Committee in 1896.

After his election President William McKinley sought to appoint Lyons as the Postmaster of Augusta but was withdrawn due to objections over his race. He was then appointed Register of the Treasury in 1898 and was the second African American to hold this post. He was reappointed in 1901 after receiving support from Booker T. Washington. Lyons later fell into disfavor with Washington after Washington learned that Lyons had expressed sympathy towards William Monroe Trotter after the 1903 Boston Riots. Lyons was not reappointed and left office in 1906. He lost reelection to the Republican National Committee in 1908.

After his political career Lyons served president of the Board of Trustees at the Haines Normal and Industrial Institute. Lyons died on June 22, 1924, in Augusta, Georgia.

See also

Republican National Convention

References

Howard University School of Law alumni
1860 births
1924 deaths
Georgia (U.S. state) Republicans
People from Augusta, Georgia
United States Department of the Treasury officials